Garden City Township may refer to the following townships in the United States:

 Garden City Township, Finney County, Kansas
 Garden City Township, Blue Earth County, Minnesota